Caserta was a historic plantation house located near Eastville, Northampton County, Virginia. The oldest section was dated to about 1736.  The house consisted of a two-story, three-bay main block with gable roof, and brick end with interior end chimney.  It had a -story end wing and hyphen, the end wing having a large exterior end chimney and a steeper gable roof than the hyphen.  The main section was built by U.S. Navy Commander George P. Upshur (1799-1852), brother of Judge Abel Parker Upshur of Vaucluse.  He owned the property from 1836 to 1847. It was destroyed by fire in 1975.

It was listed on the National Register of Historic Places in 1970 and delisted in 2001.

References

External links
Caserta, Mattawoman Creek vicinity, Eastville, Northampton County, VA 5 photos and 3 data pages at Historic American Buildings Survey

Former National Register of Historic Places in Virginia
Historic American Buildings Survey in Virginia
Plantation houses in Virginia
Houses on the National Register of Historic Places in Virginia
Greek Revival houses in Virginia
Houses completed in 1736
Houses in Northampton County, Virginia
National Register of Historic Places in Northampton County, Virginia
Burned houses in the United States
1736 establishments in Virginia